Diego Pacheco may refer to:
 Diego Pacheco (footballer)
 Diego Pacheco (boxer)